Persatuan Sepakbola Tanjungbalai dan Sekitarnya (en: Football Association Tanjungbalai and surrounding) or PSTS Tanjungbalai is an  Indonesian football club based in Tanjungbalai, North Sumatra. Club currently played in Liga 3.

References

External links
PSTS Tanjungbalai at BLAI.co
PSTS Tanjungbalai on Facebook

Football clubs in Indonesia
Association football clubs established in 1954
1954 establishments in Indonesia